Dichelachne is a genus of Australian, Indonesian, and Pacific Island plants in the grass family. They are known commonly as plumegrasses.

Species
The genus includes the following species:

  Dichelachne crinita - longhair plumegrass, clovenfoot plumegrass - Australia (incl Norfolk I), New Guinea, New Zealand (incl Chatham Is + Kermadec Is)
 Dichelachne hirtella - New South Wales, Victoria, South Australia
 Dichelachne inaequiglumis - Australia, New Zealand
 Dichelachne lautumia - South I of New Zealand
 Dichelachne micrantha - shorthair plumegrass - Australia (incl Norfolk I), New Guinea, New Zealand (North I + Kermadec Is), Rapa Iti, Easter I
 Dichelachne parva - Queensland, New South Wales, Victoria, Tasmania
 Dichelachne rara - Australia, New Guinea, Lesser Sunda Is
 Dichelachne robusta - New South Wales, Victoria
 Dichelachne sieberiana - Sieber's plumegrass - Queensland, New South Wales, Victoria, Tasmania

Formerly included:

See Anemanthele, Austrostipa, Calamagrostis, Lachnagrostis, and Oryzopsis.

 Dichelachne brachyathera - Calamagrostis brachyathera
 Dichelachne drummondiana - Lachnagrostis drummondiana
 Dichelachne procera Steud. - Anemanthele lessoniana
 Dichelachne procera Trin. & Rupr. - Oryzopsis lessoniana 
 Dichelachne rigida - Anemanthele lessoniana
 Dichelachne setacea - Austrostipa setacea 
 Dichelachne stipoides - Austrostipa stipoides

References

Pooideae
Poaceae genera